Zuleikha Robinson (born 29 June 1977) is a British actress. She first came to attention as Yves Adele Harlow, a mysterious thief on the 2001 series The Lone Gunmen. She has appeared in the films Hidalgo (2004), The Merchant of Venice (2004) and The Namesake (2006). Robinson later was a regular cast member on the series Lost (2009–10), the political thriller Homeland (2012) and the drama The Following (2015). In 2019, she joined the cast of Law & Order: SVU for their 21st season, in the recurring role of Assistant District Attorney Vanessa Hadid.

Early life
Robinson was born in London and brought up in Thailand, Singapore and Malaysia by an Indian-Burmese mother and an English father. She is also of Scottish, Burmese , Indian, Malay and Iranian descent. She is a graduate of the American Academy of Dramatic Arts in Los Angeles. She is the sister of British field botanist Dr. Alastair Robinson.

Career
Robinson has made her film debut in the 2000 experimental film Timecode. She gained attention on the 2001 series The Lone Gunmen, part of The X-Files franchise. She played Yves Adele Harlow, a mysterious thief who often aided (and sometimes hindered) the starring trio.

Robinson's first lead role brought her to Morocco, playing a 19th-century Arabian princess named Jazira, opposite Viggo Mortensen and Omar Sharif, in Disney's $80 million Western epic Hidalgo (2004), directed by Joe Johnston. The film tells the story of long-distance endurance horse rider, Frank Hopkins. In 2006, she played a Bengali character called Moushumi Mazumdar in Mira Nair's acclaimed film The Namesake, based on the book of the same name.

In 2007, Robinson had a supporting role in the HBO series Rome, and the following year played Eva Marquez, a NYPD detective, in the Fox police drama New Amsterdam. Robinson joined the cast of Lost in 2009 during its fifth season, as recurring character Ilana Verdansky, and was promoted to series regular for the sixth season. In 2012, she was cast in the second season of Homeland in a recurring role as Roya Hammad. Robinson also played a supporting role in the drama thriller film The Boy.

In 2014, Robinson was cast in Intelligence as Amelia Hayes, Gabriel's wife and a former CIA field officer.

In 2016, Robinson was cast as Lady Capulet in the ABC period drama Still Star-Crossed produced by ShondaLand.

Since 2019, she has a recurring role on Law & Order: SVU as Assistant District Attorney Vanessa Hadid, bureau chief of sex crimes at the Manhattan District Attorney's Office.

Personal life
Robinson was married to short film director Sean Doyle from 2009 to 2014.

Filmography

Film

Television

Awards and nominations

References

External links

 

Living people
1977 births
20th-century British actresses
21st-century British actresses
Actresses from London
Anglo-Burmese people
Anglo-Indian people
British actresses of Asian descent
British actresses of Indian descent
English television actresses
English film actresses
English people of Burmese descent
English people of Indian descent
English people of Iranian descent
English people of Malay descent
English people of Malaysian descent
English people of Scottish descent
20th-century English women
20th-century English people
21st-century English women
21st-century English people